Jacobberger House may refer to either of two houses in Portland, Oregon, designed and occupied by architect Joseph Jacobberger:

Josef Jacobberger House, SW Upper Hall Street
Joseph Jacobberger Country House, SW Sweetbriar Street